The 1971 Barking Borough Council election took place on 13 May 1971 to elect members of Barking London Borough Council in London, England. The whole council was up for election and the Labour Party stayed in overall control of the council.

Background
96 Candidates across 6 parties ran.
Labour was the only party that ran a full slate of candidates.

Results
Labour comfortably maintained its majority. The Conservatives lost all 13 of its councillors to Labour whilst the Residents Association held all 4 of its Councillors.
Labour won 45 councillors to the Residents Association 4.

Results by ward

Abbey

Cambell

Chadwell Heath

Eastbrook

Fanshawe

Gascoigne

Heath

Longbridge

Manor

River

Valence

Village

By-elections between 1971 and 1974

Chadwell Heath

Gascoigne

River

References

1971
1971 London Borough council elections